Salamon Raj a/l Adaickalam (born 23 March 1994) is a Malaysian professional footballer who plays as a defensive midfielder for Petaling Jaya City.

Career statistics

Club

Honours
Sri Pahang
 Malaysia FA Cup: 2018

References

External links
 

Malaysian footballers
Sri Pahang FC players
Petaling Jaya City FC players
1994 births
Living people
Association football midfielders
People from Selangor
Malaysia Super League players
Malaysian people of Indian descent